Billy and Betty was a 15-minute children's adventure radio series which began broadcasting on the NBC Red Network in 1935. Sponsored by Sheffield Farms Grade A Milk, it was usually heard at 6:45pm on weekday afternoons.

Characters and story
Robert Sloane directed the series. The storyline followed a brother and sister, Billy and Betty, during their various misadventures. The cast included character actor James McCallion (1918-1991), who also portrayed Skeezix on the Gasoline Alley radio program.

In December 1935, the Child Study Association of America reported that radio programs for children showed "distinct evidence of efforts to improve the radio's offerings along the lines demanded by an increasingly informed public." Programs approved by the Child Study Association of America included The Singing Lady, Popeye the Sailor and Billy and Betty.

The Christmas Adventure of Billy and Betty was a 1941 Victor-Bluebird recording.

References

External links
"Juvenile Radio Programs"by Terry G.G. Salomonson

1930s American radio programs
NBC radio programs